Mohammed Abbas is a former Lebanon international rugby league footballer who represented Lebanon at the 2000 World Cup.

Background
Abbas was born in Sydney, New South Wales, Australia.

Playing career
Abbas played for the Canterbury-Bankstown Bulldogs, playing alongside the likes of Hazem El Masri and Brent Sherwin in their 1998 President's Cup side. He played for Lebanon in their 1999 World Cup qualification matches and was named in their 2000 World Cup squad.

References

Rugby league players from Sydney
Australian people of Lebanese descent
Sportspeople of Lebanese descent
Lebanon national rugby league team players
Rugby league wingers
Year of birth missing (living people)
Rugby league fullbacks
Living people